Jessica Nadine Littlewood (born 1982/1983) is a Canadian politician who was the Member of the Legislative Assembly of Alberta representing the electoral district of Fort Saskatchewan-Vegreville from 2015 to 2019. She was first elected as a member of the New Democratic Party in the 2015 general election.

Prior to being elected, Littlewood worked as an accounting executive assistant at the firm Ernst and Young. She has also worked as an assistant manager Goodwill Industries of Alberta, and as a nursing attendant at Good Samaritan Society.

Within the legislature, Littlewood served as the chair of the Select Special Ethics and Accountability Committee. This special committee was formed to review the Alberta Elections Act, and related legislation, and give a report within a year. She was also the chair of the Standing Committee on Privileges and Elections, Standing Orders and Printing.

Electoral history

2019 general election

2015 general election

References

Alberta New Democratic Party MLAs
Living people
1980s births
Women MLAs in Alberta
21st-century Canadian politicians
21st-century Canadian women politicians